Andrei Rublev (also transliterated as Andrey Rublyov) was a Muscovite icon painter born in the 1360s who died between 1427 and 1430 in Moscow. He is considered to be one of the greatest medieval Russian painters of Orthodox Christian icons and frescos.

Early life
Little information survives about his life; even where he was born is unknown. He probably lived in the Trinity-St. Sergius Lavra, near Moscow, under Nikon of Radonezh, who became hegumen after the death of Sergius of Radonezh in 1392. The first mention of Rublev is in 1405, when he decorated icons and frescos for the Cathedral of the Annunciation of the Moscow Kremlin, in company with Theophanes the Greek and Prokhor of Gorodets. His name was the last of the list of masters, as the junior both by rank and by age. Theophanes was an important Byzantine master, who moved to Russia and is considered to have trained Rublev.

Career
Chronicles tell us that together with Daniel Chorny he painted the Assumption Cathedral in Vladimir in 1408 as well as the Trinity Cathedral in the Trinity Lavra of St. Sergius between 1425 and 1427. After Daniel's death, Andrei came to Moscow's Andronikov Monastery where he painted his last work, the frescoes of the Saviour Cathedral. He is also believed to have painted at least one of the miniatures in the Khitrovo Gospels.

The only work authenticated as entirely his is the icon of the Trinity (c. 1410, currently in the Tretyakov Gallery, Moscow). It is based on an earlier icon known as the "Hospitality of Abraham" (illustrating ). Rublev removed the figures of Abraham and Sarah from the scene, and through a subtle use of composition and symbolism changed the subject to focus on the Mystery of the Trinity.

In Rublev's art two traditions are combined: the highest asceticism and the classic harmony of Byzantine mannerism. The characters of his paintings are always peaceful and calm. After some time his art came to be perceived as the ideal of Eastern Church painting and of Orthodox iconography.

Death and legacy
Rublev died at Andronikov Monastery between 1427 and 1430. Rublev's work influenced many artists including Dionisy. The Stoglavi Sobor (1551) promulgated Rublev's icon style as a model for church painting. Since 1959 the Andrei Rublev Museum at the Andronikov Monastery has displayed his and related art.

The Russian Orthodox Church canonized Rublev as a saint in 1988, celebrating his feast day on 29 January and/or on 4 July.

In 1966, Andrei Tarkovsky made a film Andrei Rublev, loosely based on the artist's life. This became the first (and perhaps only) film produced in the Soviet era to treat the artist as a world-historic figure and Christianity as an axiom of Russia's historical identity, during a turbulent period in the history of Russia.

Veneration 

 29 January – commemoration of his death anniversary (Greek Orthodox Church)
 12/13 June – feast day, Synaxis of All of Andronikov Monastery (with Andronicus, Sabbas, Alexander, Abbots of Moscow and Daniel the Black, the icon painter)
 4 July – main feast day from the list of "Russian saints of Moscow and Vladimir" by Nikodim (Kononov),
 6 July – Synaxis of All Saints of Radonezh
 Synaxis of all saints of Moscow – movable holiday on the Sunday before 26 August (ROC)

Selected works

References

Sources
Andrei Rublev, a 1966 film by Andrei Tarkovsky loosely based on the painter's life.
 Mikhail V. Alpatov, Andrey Rublev, Moscow: Iskusstvo, 1972.
Gabriel Bunge, The Rublev Trinity, transl. Andrew Louth, St. Vladimir's Seminary Press, Crestwood, New York, 2007.
Sergius Golubtsov, Voplosh’enie bogoslovskih idey v tvorchestve prepodobnogo Andreya Rubleva [The realization of theological ideas in creative works of Andrey Rublev]. Bogoslovskie trudy 22, 20–40, 1981.
Troitca Andreya Rubleva [The Trinity of Andrey Rublev], Gerold I. Vzdornov (ed.), Moscow: Iskusstvo 1989.
Viktor N. Lazarev, The Russian Icon: From Its Origins to the Sixteenth Century, Gerold I. Vzdornov (ed.). Collegeville, MN: Liturgical Press, 1997.
Priscilla Hunt, Andrei Rublev's Old Testament Trinity Icon in Cultural Context, The Trinity-Sergius Lavr in Russian History and Culture: Readings in Russian Religious Culture, vol. 3, ed. Deacon Vladimir Tsurikov, (Jordanville, NY: Holy Trinity Seminary Press, 2006), 99-122.(See on-line at phslavic.com)
Priscilla Hunt, Andrei Rublev's Old Testament Trinity Icon: Problems of Meaning, Intertextuality, and Transmission, Symposion: A Journal of Russian (Religious) Thought, ed. Roy Robson, 7-12 (2002–2007), 15-46 (See on-line at www.phslavic.com)
Konrad Onasch, Das Problem des Lichtes in der Ikonomalerei Andrej Rublevs. Zur 600–Jahrfeier des grossen russischen Malers, vol. 28. Berlin: Berliner byzantinische Arbeiten, 1962.
Konrad Onasch, Das Gedankenmodell des byzantisch–slawischen Kirchenbaus. In Tausend Jahre Christentum in Russland, Karl Christian Felmy et al. (eds.), 539–543. Go¨ ttingen: Vandenhoeck und Ruprecht, 1988.
Eugeny N. Trubetskoi, Russkaya ikonopis'. Umozrenie w kraskah. Wopros o smysle vizni w drewnerusskoj religioznoj viwopisi [Russian icon painting. Colourful contemplation. Question of the meaning of life in early Russian religious painting], Moscow: Beliy Gorod, 2003 [1916].
Georgij Yu. Somov, Semiotic systemity of visual artworks: Case study of The Holy Trinity by Rublev, Semiotica 166 (1/4), 1-79, 2007.

External links

 Andrey Rublev Official Web Site
 Rublev at the Russian Art Gallery
 Selected works by Andrei Rublev: icons, frescoes and miniatures
 "The Deesis painted by Andrey Rublev" from the Annunciation Church of the Moscow Kremlin - article by Dr. Oleg G. Uliyanov
 Historical documentation on Andrei Rublev, compiled by Robert Bird
 Venerable Andrew Rublev the Iconographer Orthodox icon and synaxarion

14th-century births
14th-century painters
14th-century Russian people
15th-century Christian saints
15th-century deaths
15th-century painters
15th-century Russian people
Christian artists
Manuscript illuminators
Medieval Russian artists
Russian icon painters
Russian painters
Russian male painters
Russian saints of the Eastern Orthodox Church
Medieval Russian painters